Softdisk was a software and Internet company based in Shreveport, Louisiana. Founded in 1981, its original products were disk magazines (which they termed "magazettes", for "magazine on diskette").  It was affiliated and partly owned by paper magazine Softalk at founding, but survived its demise.

Games

Released

Big Blue compilations

References 

Softdisk